Ahmadreza Jalali (born 14 August 2001) is an Iranian footballer who plays as a left-back who currently plays for Iranian club Foolad in the Persian Gulf Pro League.

Honours 
Foolad
Hazfi Cup: 2020–21
Iranian Super Cup: 2021

Iran U16
 AFC U-16 Championship runner-up: 2016

Iran U19
 CAFA Junior Championship 2019

References

2001 births
Living people
Iranian footballers
Foolad FC players
Association football defenders